Tuccio may refer to:

Punta Beppe Tuccio Lighthouse, an active lighthouse located on the north eastern tip of the island of Linosa, Italy
Daniel Tuccio, Peruvian-American television reporter/news anchor
Paolo di Mariano di Tuccio Taccone (or Paolo Tuccone), Italian early Renaissance sculptor and goldsmith
Tuccio d'Andria (Late 15th century), Italian painter

Tuccio Musumeci (born 1934), Italian actor and comedian